

Resources of "Uji Ftohte" 
This hydromanument is on the right of the national motorway Tepelena - Gjirokastra, shortly after the autopilot road to the Përmet.The source comes from the upper left slope of the Drinos valley in the contact of limestone with flushes. The atmospheric rainwater that falls in the easternmost part of the Kurveleshi (Highland), through the carvings and carcass of caves, penetrates into the depths of the limestone rocks and nourish this source. Water noise, greenery, bird chatter etc. have turned this place into a vacationing environment for the traveler. About 20 years ago,  social service facilities were built. This touristic spot is also frequented by the inhabitants of the cities of Tepelenë,  Përmet , Gjirokastra. It is easily visited as it is next to the Tepelenë-Gjirokastër motorway. There are scientific hydrological, geomorphological, aesthetic and tourist values.

The Hormova Plane 
This is located in the center of the village of Hormova in the district of Tepelena. Its height is about 20 m, the trunk diameter is about 1.2 m. Under its shadow, the village men discussed and made important decisions to solve their problems. There are scientific (biological), didactic, historical and tourist values of local importance. It can be visited by rural road: Tepelene-Hormove

Bokërrimat e Dangëllisë 
This is located between the villages of Frashër - Miçan and Gostënckë, at 1000 m above sea level. It is an erosive landscape shaped by powerful flysch erosion caused by natural factors and intervention Inappropriate human environment. There are scientific values (geological, geomorphologic, pedological, biological), ecological, didactic, educational. It is visited by the automobile route Përmet - Frashër - Miçan and then taken the pedestrian path to the monument.

Gropa e Kazanit 
This is located between the villages of Stërmbec - Kalash, 600 m above sea level. It is a large glacial circus formed in limestone of the upper cretaceous. It has a length of 150 meters and a width of up to 70 m. It has the shape of a giant couch with some smaller karst forms. It has scientific values (geological, geomorphological, hydrological), didactic, ecological and cultural. It is visited by the motorway Përmet - Stërmbec and then taken the pedestrian path to the monument.

Uji i Zi Këlcyrë 
This is situated near the town of Këlcyrë, on the left side of the Vjosa river, in northern Dhëmbel  mountain, at an altitude of 160 m above sea level.  It consists of 8-10 karstic sources with a flow rate of 400-500 L/s, emerging in the lithological contact between the limestone and the flysch ash. They have clean and cold water. They create a very attractive environment. They have scientific values (geological, geomorphological, hydrological), cultural, didactic and tourist.

Fir of Kokojka 
This is located near the homonymous village of Përmet district, close to the mountain of Kokojka of the Highlands of Danglia. It consists of spruce fir of Macedonian type with average height of 15 - 20 m, diameter of trunk about 20 - 30 cm and circumference 80 - 100 cm. They create a rich biodiversity ecosystem and are attractive. It has biological, aesthetic, and tourist value.  It can be visited by the automobile road Përmet - Frashër - Kokojka.

The Stone of Atos 
This is located near Kutal village, on the left side of Vjosa river, 213 m above sea level. It is a stone with a special shape (gaps) formed in the limestone of the upper cretaceous. It is up to 15 feet long, up to 10 m wide and up to 20 m high. There are scientific, geological, geomorphological values, didactic, ecological and cultural. It is visited by the road Permet - Kutal and then the pedestrian path to the Monument 
Tourism in Albania